Bururi Province is one of the eighteen provinces of Burundi. It was formerly Burundi's largest province until the communes of Burambi, Buyengero and Rumonge were transferred to the province of Rumonge when it was created in 2015.

Overview
Bururi Province was  created on 26 September 1960 as part of national political and administrative reforms initiated by the Belgian colonial administration in Ruanda-Urundi. Burundi became independent in 1962 and the province was retained in the new national constitution.

The provincial capital is Bururi. Bururi Province is home to the Bururi Forest Nature Reserve, a remnant Afromontane tropical forest. The Ruvyironza River, which rises in Bururi Province, is the southernmost source of the Nile.

Bururi is famous for the number of military and political leaders to have been born there, including three consecutive presidents (Michel Micombero, Jean-Baptiste Bagaza and Pierre Buyoya) following the country's independence.

Communes
It is divided administratively into the following communes:

 Commune of Bururi
 Commune of Matana
 Commune of Mugamba
 Commune of Rutovu
 Commune of Songa
 Commune of Vyanda

References

 
Provinces of Burundi